Dogleg or dog-leg may refer to:

Dogleg (band), an American indie rock band
Dog-leg (stairs), a configuration of stairs which includes a half-landing before turning and continuing upwards
Dog-leg gearbox, an unusual manual transmission layout
Dogleg, a feature of a golf course
Dogleg, or staggered junction, a type of road intersection
Dogleg, a type of artifact in computer imaging, colloquially known as jaggies
Dogleg, a guided, powered turn during ascent phase of a rocket launch
Dogleg, a shape of an oval track with a recognizable kink

See also 
Dog anatomy
Canine terminology